Paradise Road may refer to:

 Paradise Road (1936 film), a film directed by Martin Frič
 Paradise Road (1997 film), a film directed by Bruce Beresford
 Paradise Road (Las Vegas), a road in Las Vegas
 "Paradise Road" (song), a 1980 song by South African group Joy